The New Churches in London and Westminster Act 1710 is an Act of Parliament in England in 1710, which set up the Commission for Building Fifty New Churches, with the purpose of building fifty new churches for the rapidly growing population of London.

References

Great Britain Acts of Parliament 1710
Christianity and law in the 18th century
1710 in Christianity
1710s in London
History of the City of London
18th century in the City of Westminster
Law about religion in the United Kingdom
Law in London